The Last Breath is a Canadian drama film, released in 1999. Written by Joanne Arseneau and directed by Richard Ciupka, the film stars Luc Picard as Laurent Vaillancourt, a police officer from Montreal who travels to Arkansas to solve the murder of his brother Martin (Michel Goyette).

The film's cast also includes Julien Poulin, Serge Houde, Anik Matern and Paul Ahmarani.

Awards
The film garnered three Genie Award nominations at the 20th Genie Awards in 2000, including Best Overall Sound (Michel Descombes, Jo Caron, Gavin Fernandes and Michel Charron), Best Sound Editing (Louis Dupire, Diane Boucher, Jérôme Décarie, Christian Rivest
and Alice Wright) and Best Original Song (Daniel Bélanger).

Poulin won the Prix Jutra for Best Supporting Actor. The film was also nominated for Best Film, Best Actor (Picard), Best Sound and Best Supporting Actress (Linda Singer).

External links

1999 films
Canadian drama films
Films directed by Richard Ciupka
1999 drama films
1990s French-language films
French-language Canadian films
1990s Canadian films